The 2018 Judo World Masters were held in Guangzhou, China, from 15 to 16 December 2018.

Medal summary

Medal table

Men's events

Women's events

References

External links
 

World Masters
IJF World Masters
World Masters
World Masters